Rosa 'Schoener's Nutkana' is a deep pink rose variety named after Father Georg Schöner (1864–1941), a priest who became a notable rose breeder, who developed this rose in 1930 as a cross between Rosa nutkana and the hybrid perpetual 'Paul Neyron' (Levet, 1869).

Their colour is light to carmine-pink with a large circle of yellow stamens. The long-lasting flowers are moderately fragrant, develop from small, pointed buds, and appear in small clusters of two to five on short strong stems in a spring or summer flush with some scattered flowers later on. In autumn, the shrub sports rose hips.

The plant tends to be a tall, sprawling shrub, with very few thorns on its arching shoots and small light to medium grey-green foliage with seven leaflets. The vigorous shrub tolerates half-shade and poorer soils, is very disease resistant and winter hardy down to −25 °C (USDA zone 5). It is well suited to form hedges.

References

External links 
HelpMeFind Roses: Schoener's Nutkana

Schoener's Nutkana